Die Goldenen Zitronen ("The Golden Lemons") are a German punk rock band from Hamburg, formed in 1984. They are considered a forerunner to the "Hamburger Schule" and are noted for their anti-establishment stance. Formed by Schorsch Kamerun (vocals), Ale Sexfeind (drums), Ted Gaier (bass, guitar), and Aldo Moro (guitar, bass), the band have released thirteen albums to date. Of the original line-up only Kamerun and Gaier remain, who both developed a number of side-projects.

History
Initially they combined hard rock with 1970s-era punk and lyrics that were both angry, yet comedic and pop-like. The band rejected the traditional music industry, seeing themselves as a symbol of artistic independence not wanting to "serve the structures of rock" (Ted Gaier). Of the founding members, only Schorsch Kamerun and Ted Gaier remain. The new members are Thomas Wenzel (Die Sterne) under the pseudonym Julius Block, keyboarder and drummer Mense Reents (Egoexpress, Stella), and Enno Paluca.

In 1986, Die Goldenen Zitronen courted initial attention with their single "Am Tag als Thomas Anders starb" ("on the day Thomas Anders died"). Their subsequent release, "Für Immer Punk", was a cult hit in the German punk scene, inspiring comparisons with bands such as Abwärts, Die Toten Hosen, and Die Ärzte.

The band developed their style further with 1990s Fuck You, in which they mock popular rock groups and protest against the tedium of daily life.

1994's Das Bisschen Totschlag saw a major musical transition, in which Zitronen mixed their usual power-rock style with elements of garage-trash, electro-beat, hip-hop and noise-pop. This trend of experimentation continued with 1996's Economy Class which was influenced by improvisational jazz.

With 1998's Dead School Hamburg (a jab at the Hamburger Schule trend of music), the band further altered their style, pursuing a greater emphasis on electronic instrumentation. Their album Schafott zum Fahrstuhl, takes a more avant-garde direction.

Die Goldenen Zitronen have had a diverse number of collaborators, ranging from the poet Franz Josef Degenhardt to new acts such as Chicks on Speed or Peaches.

Discography

Albums 

Porsche, Genscher, Hallo HSV (Weser Label, 1987)
Kampfstern Mallorca dockt an (Weser Label, 1988)
Fuck You (Vielklang, 1990)
Punkrock (Vielklang, 1991)
Das bißchen Totschlag (Sub-up Records, 1994)
Economy Class (Sub-Up Records, 1996)
Dead School Hamburg (Give me a Vollzeitarbeit) (Cooking Vinyl, 1998)
Schafott zum Fahrstuhl (BuBack, 2001)
Lenin (BuBack, 2006)
Die Entstehung der Nacht (BuBack, 2009)
Who's Bad (Buback 2013)
Flogging a Dead Frog (Altin Village & Mine Records, 2015)
More Than a Feeling (BuBack, 2019)

Compilations 

 Hit Container (Weser Label, 1990) – cassette only

EP 

 Das ist Rock – live in Japan (Weser Label, 1988)

Singles 

 "Doris ist in der Gang" (Weser Label, 1987)

Films
 German filmmaker Jörg Siepmann produced the film Golden Lemons, a documentary about 2002 United States-Tour of the band, which they made together with Wesley Willis and other bands. The film had its premiere at the Berlin International Film Festival in February 2003. Die Goldenen Zitronen dissociate themselves from the film.
 In 2007 Übriggebliebene ausgereifte Haltungen, another "rockumentary" about Die Goldenen Zitronen, by German filmmaker Peter Ott had its premiere in Hamburg and was released in German cinemas and on DVD in 2008.

Other band member projects
 Ted Gaier: Three Normal Beatles and Les Robespieres (with Klaus Ramcke); Schwabinggrad Ballett (with Bernadette La Hengst, Knarf Rellöm)
 Mense Reents: Die Vögel (with Jakobus Durstewitz); N.R.F.B (Nuclear Raped Fuck Bomb) with (Jens Rachut, Lisa Hagmeister, Thomas Wenzel, Rebecca „Becci“ Oehms and Armin Nagel); Stella (with Elena Lange, Thies Mynther); Sophia Kennedy (producer)
 Julius Block: Die Sterne (with Frank Spilker and Christoph Leich); Cow (with Peta Devlin, Eckhard „Ecki“ Heins and Thomas Butteweg)

References

External links
 Official website (in German)
 Interview (in German)
 Review of 'Entstehung der nacht'

Culture in Hamburg
Musical groups established in 1984
Musical groups from Hamburg
German punk rock groups
1984 establishments in West Germany